The 1987 Langs Scottish Masters was a professional non-ranking snooker tournament that took place between 17 and 20 September 1987 at the Hospitality Inn in Glasgow, Scotland.

Joe Johnson won the tournament by defeating Terry Griffiths 9–7 in the final.

Tournament draw

References

1987
Masters
Scottish Masters
Scottish Masters